The lineated barbet (Psilopogon lineatus) is an Asian barbet native to the Terai, the Brahmaputra basin to Southeast Asia. It is a frugivore and nests in holes of tree trunks.

References

External links

lineated barbet
Birds of India
Birds of Nepal
Birds of Bangladesh
Birds of Eastern Himalaya
Birds of Southeast Asia
lineated barbet
lineated barbet